The Norman peasants' revolt in 996 was a revolt against Norman nobility. The revolt was defeated by nobility under the early reign and minority of Richard II, Duke of Normandy. His uncle Rodulf of Ivry was the regent of Normandy during the revolt.

The revolt was started in 996 after the peasants had met in local assemblies (conventicula) throughout Normandy. The revolt was coordinated by a central assembly (conventus) that was formed by members of the local assemblies. Each conventicula sent two representatives to the central assembly.

The peasants wanted concessions on various economic grievances. These included Barons harassing the peasants with vexatious services, the main reason however was the removal of hunting rights, lest a deer be killed. Medieval sources claim that the revolt was caused by demands of free hunting and fishing rights.

The revolt probably only affected Seine valley rather than whole Normandy. Dating of the revolt in 996 has been also disputed.

The revolt may have been a reaction to rise of serfdom in Normandy. It has been suggested that the revolt resulted in abolishing serfdom in Normandy. Lack of serfdom in Normandy has been also linked to depopulation of coastal France brought by warfare. However, evidence for existence and extent of serfdom has been difficult to obtain.

Peasant leaders who brought complaints to the regent Rodulf of Ivry had their hands and feet cut off, after they were captured. Others were blinded, impaled, or burnt alive, land owners forfeited their land.

Despite the revolt at start of his reign, rest of the Richard II's reign was very peaceful. In May 1023 he did not implement the Peace of God due to calm situation in his lands. However, Norman culture returned to its Frankish characteristics and lost Scandinavian influences.

See also
List of peasant revolts
Richard I of Normandy
Roman de Rou that recounts the revolt

References

Further reading
Le pays normand. Paysages et peuplement (IXe-XIIIe siècles)  (The Norman region. Landscapes and Population [9th–13th centuries])

996
990s conflicts
10th-century rebellions
Battles involving the Normans
Peasant revolts
Military history of France
Duchy of Normandy